Moeyo Ken, known in Japan as , is a PS2 video game from 2002 about magical girl variants of Shinsengumi, a police force, and of Sakamoto Ryunosuke and his illegal companion, Nekomaru. The game was adapted into an OVA and a television series. Moeyo Ken was created by Hiroi Oji, creator of the Sakura Wars series, with character designs by Rumiko Takahashi, the creator of Ranma ½ and Inuyasha.

ADV Films licensed it effective September 25, 2006 for $43,335.

TV Series

Set in an alternate universe Meiji Era, the lead male character of the story, Ryunosuke Sakamoto, is travelling from Shanghai towards Kyoto with his newly licensed yōkai Nekomaru. The law in the story states that to be in legal possession of such a creature that it must be licensed. The Shinsengumi are enforcers of this law.

Characters

The Mobile Shinsengumi
Yuko Kondo

 is the daughter of Isami Kondo and field commander of the Mobile Shinsengumi. She has a habit of breaking her sword in battle, and a tendency to rack up debts wherever she goes. Yuko is slightly scatterbrained and has pink hair, and enjoys making fun of Okita's breasts.
Kondo seems to be the fondest of the three girls of Oryou, since she frequently imagines the older woman committing suicide if Ryuunosuke were to return to Shanghai. To prevent this from happening, she comes up with various harebrained ideas to keep the young man in Kyoto by making him fall in love with a local waitress named Sayoko. Most of her plans to make the pair fall in love fail miserably, and soon her plans become less about preventing his departure and more about succeeding.
Kondo somewhat resembles the female version of Ranma Saotome from Ranma ½, with her tomboyish attitude, huge appetite, crazy schemes and constant debts.
Toshie Hijikata

 is the daughter of Toshizo Hijikata and the Mobile Shinsengumi's crackshot sharpshooter. While she may be an expert on guns, she is not an excellent cook (due to having a bad sense of taste). Not much of her background is known, but apparently she cannot remember her mother's face and the only photo she has of her is missing a face. As a result, Gennai created a "mother" robot that is an exact double of Toshie, which caused some confusion.
Hijikata seems to be the most intelligent of the three girls, since she is seen relaxing in a hot spring by reading a Jules Verne book. She is also the most logical of them, to the point where Kondo often claims she's like a machine. She also strongly resembles a female version of Sesshomaru from Inuyasha, since she has similar long white hair, Chinese-influenced clothes, an icy attitude and is dismissive of slapstick.
Kaoru Okita
Voiced by: Haruna Ikezawa (Japanese) ; Jessica Schwartz (OVA), Nancy Novotny (TV series) (English)
 is the daughter of Soji Okita. She uses all sorts of weapons including shikigami of the legendary beasts (Genbu, Byakko, Seiryu and Suzaku). Kaoru takes it personally when she's told about her breast size.
It is revealed later in the series that Okita is actually only half human, having a kitsune mother who married Soji Okita and later abandoned her daughter, claiming she couldn't live among humans. She also has a kitsune older brother. Additionally, she develops a major crush on Ryuunosuke.
Ryunosuke Sakamoto
Voiced by: Chisa Yokoyama (Japanese); Evan Slack (OVA), Blake Shepard (TV series) (English)
 is the son of Oryo, president of the Shinsengumi. Ryuunosuke was sent to Shanghai at the age of ten to learn more about the world. He recently returned from Shanghai and brought a monster named Nekomaru to Kyoto for registration. Ryunosuke is a bit odd and has a peculiar sense of humor, but he is nevertheless determined to help out the Mobile Shinsengumi. He seems to also have a crush on Yuko. In the 8th episode of the series he temporarily turns into a girl because Nekomaru killed him with soap and switched his soul with that of a female.
Nekomaru

 is a bakeneko, a monster cat, who traveled with Ryunosuke from Shanghai to Kyoto. Nekomaru whines and cowers whenever there is trouble, which becomes more understandable as the series goes on because Gennai frequently uses him as a guinea pig.
Nekomaru is 300 years old and seems to have a fair amount of power. His most useful ability is being able to transfer one of his nine lives to someone who has died, resurrecting them in perfect health. He seems particularly fond of Ryunosuke and seems to want the young man to be happy.
Gennai Hiraga

 is the Mobile Shinsengumi's resident mad doctor who builds new weapons and gadgets to aid the team in stopping unlicensed monsters from destroying Tokyo. Most of his gadgets are useless and/or dangerous, such as the digging machine fueled by monsters' power. However, he is an excellent cook and a few of his gadgets are actually useful.
Gennai does have a ruthless side: he often uses Nekomaru to test his inventions, which frequently has unpleasant results for the monster cat. And if people around him aren't sufficiently helpful, he acquires gleaming eyes and a demonic rumbling voice. Nekomaru claims that Gennai is even more of a monster than he is.
Gennai strongly resembles Dr. Tofu from Rumiko Takahashi's Ranma ½.
Kiyomi Watase

The Tsubame Group
 are the villains in the Meiji era representing the new government and try to return monsters to their old selves before monster registration was effective. The compose of mean girl , handsome and fearless  and the short and strange . They greatly resemble Team Rocket from the Pokémon franchise.

Miki Saotome
Voiced by: Rumi Kasahara (Japanese); Shannon Grounds (English)
Miki Saotome is the cruel and ruthless leader of the Tsubame Group, which consists of Ukon Tanaka and Sakon Suzuki. Her intentions are to turn all monsters to her side and destroy Kyoto and the Mobile Shinsengumi, and take over the world. It's hinted that she may have feelings for Ukon, but this is not specifically made clear as she treats him like he were her servant (which he is). It is revealed that she was once a priestess of a shrine before it was destroyed by monsters. Miki does not fight, but she is a practitioner of black magic which is used to summon a destructive demon.
Ukon Tanaka
Voiced by: Takeshi Kusao (Japanese); Gray Haddock (English)
Ukon Tanaka is a fierce and courageous swordsman who takes pride in how charming he believes he is. He is also the Tsubame group's second-in-command. While he isn't Miki's ideal "knight in shining armor" He still holds himself to that status and calls Miki a "princess" (though whether she is a princess or not isn't specified). It is revealed that before he met Miki, he was training to become a master swordsman, but he was defeated in a tournament and was forced to abandon any hopes of becoming one. Ukon fights using a samurai katana (similar to the one Yuko uses).
Sakon Suzuki
Voiced by: Toshihiko Nakajima (Japanese); Bill Wise (English
Sakon Suzuki is a short, overweight, and possibly mentally crazy member of the Tsubame group. He loves Chinese cabbage and continuously talks about it or refers to it at the most inappropriate times, but occasionally he does talk about other things (like tempura or Chinese candies). He is also hinted to be rather gluttonous with an almost uncontrollable appetite (clarified in one episode where he tried to eat a nikuman that was stuffed with a gas that inflates a human being like a balloon). Despite Sakon's random outbursts and constant references to Chinese cabbage, he is very loyal to Miki and would be lost without her (and Ukon). Sakon fights with a wooden self hand-crafted bazooka.

Notes

References

External links
Moeyo Ken at Funimation
Moeyo Ken at A.D. Vision (archive)
 Official site (archive)
 Moeyo Ken game - Enterbrain

 

2002 video games
PlayStation 2-only games
PlayStation 2 games
2003 anime OVAs
2005 anime television series debuts
ADV Films
Fantasy anime and manga
Funimation
Oji Hiroi
Samurai in anime and manga
Anime film and television articles using incorrect naming style